Ernest Dong (born 22 February 1942) is a Cameroonian boxer. He competed in the men's light welterweight event at the 1968 Summer Olympics. At the 1968 Summer Olympics, he lost to Antoniu Vasile of Romania.

References

1942 births
Living people
Cameroonian male boxers
Olympic boxers of Cameroon
Boxers at the 1968 Summer Olympics
People from Centre Region (Cameroon)
Light-welterweight boxers
20th-century Cameroonian people